Federalist No. 31 is an essay by Alexander Hamilton, the thirty-first of The Federalist Papers. It was published on January 1, 1788, under the pseudonym Publius, the name under which all The Federalist papers were published. This is the second of seven essays by Hamilton on the controversial issue of taxation. It is titled "The Same Subject Continued: Concerning the General Power of Taxation".

Brief Precis
Hamilton argues that a government must possess all the powers necessary for achieving its objectives. It must have the means to secure an end. One of these means is the power of taxation. Hamilton argues that the great body of representatives will seek to prevent abuse of this power and usurpation of the state governments' abilities to collect taxes.

External links 

 Text of The Federalist No. 31: congress.gov

31
1788 in American law
1788 essays
1788 in the United States